Hendrick Aerts (alternative names: Hendrick Aertsz., Henricus Arijssel, Hendrik Arts, Henricus A. Rijssel) (probably Mechelen, between 1565 and 1575 - probably Gdańsk, January 1603) was a Flemish painter and draftsman who painted mainly architectural paintings and was active in Gdańsk and Prague.

Life
Little is known about the origins, formation and life of Hendrick Aerts.  It was originally assumed that he was from Lille, which at the presumed time of his birth was part of the Southern Netherlands.  Recent research, in particular that conducted by Bernard M. Vermet, has questioned the previous assumptions about the life of the artist and Aerts is now assumed to be a native of Mechelen.

Vermet has further suggested that the clear influence of the work of the Flemish architecture painter Paul Vredeman de Vries is likely due to Aerts having been a pupil of Paul Vredeman de Vries.  The training probably took place when both artists resided in Gdańsk in the period from 1592 to 1595.  Aerts would then have accompanied Vredeman de Vries to Prague from 1596 to 1599, where he worked as his assistant in the decoration of the ceilings and the reception rooms of Emperor Rudolf II's castle.

From 1599 Aerts could have returned to Gdańsk, where he probably died in 1603.

Work

Only a few paintings of Hendrick Aerts have been preserved.  Research attributes less than ten paintings to him. The earliest reliable work is dated 1600 and the last known work 1602.

Like his presumed master Paul Vredeman de Vries, he exclusively painted fantastic architectural works of imaginary and luxurious palaces and church interiors, in which the human figures often represent allegories.

Known works
Amsterdam, Rijksmuseum
 Imaginary renaissance palace. 1602
Braunschweig, Herzog Anton Ulrich Museum
 Interior of a Gothic church.
The Hague, Museum Bredius
 Allegory of death. 1602 
Whereabouts unknown
 Allegory of love and death. c. 1600/01  (2002 in Paris, Galerie De Jonckheere)
 Marketplace.  (until at least 1913 in a private collection in Schwedt an den Oder) 
 Interior of a Gothic church.  (attributed - auctioned on 7 June 1994 by the Dorotheum in Vienna) 
 The inside of a cathedral with procession.  (on 5 July 2000 auctioned by Bonhams Knightsbridge)

Literature 
Bernard M. Vermet, Hendrick Aerts, Gentse Bijdragen tot de Kunstgeschiedenis en Oudheidkunde, 30 (1995), S. 107-118
Bernard M. Vermet, Architektuurschilders in Dantzig. Hendrick Aerts en Hans en Paul Vredeman de Vries, Gentse Bijdragen tot de Kunstgeschiedenis en Oudheidkunde, 31 (1996), S. 27-57
Jan Briels, Vlaamse schilders en de dageraad van Hollands Gouden Eeuw 1585-1630, Antwerpen 1997, S. 292
Hendrick Aerts. In: Ulrich Thieme, Felix Becker u. a.: Allgemeines Lexikon der Bildenden Künstler von der Antike bis zur Gegenwart. Band 2, Wilhelm Engelmann, Leipzig 1908, S. 165.
Hendrick Aerts. In: Allgemeines Künstlerlexikon. Die Bildenden Künstler aller Zeiten und Völker (AKL). Band 5, Saur, München u.a. 1992, S. 341f
G.L.M. Daniëls, Kerkgeschiedenis en politiek in het perspectief van Hendrick Aerts, Antiek 9 (1974-1975), S. 63-69

References

1570s births
1603 deaths
Flemish Renaissance painters
Artists from Mechelen